National Highway 185 (NH 185) is a highway in India running from Adimali to Kumily through Kattappana and ends in kumily Attapallam  Village   in Kerala.

Route 
Adimali - Cheruthoni - Kattappana - Anavilasom - Kumily.

Junctions  

 Terminal near Adimali.

 Terminal near Kumily.

See also
 List of National Highways in India (by Highway Number)
 List of National Highways in India
 National Highways Development Project

References

External links
 NH 185 on OpenStreetMap

National highways in India
National Highways in Kerala
Roads in Idukki district